Siva Prakasar (also Ṣiva Prakāṣa or sometimes Ṣiva-prakāṣa Dēṣikar), was a Tamil ( துறைமங்கலம்  சிவப்பிரகாசர்,  கற்பனைக்களஞ்சியம் ) poet and philosopher lived during the late 17th and early 18th centuries.  He was called 'Thurai mangalam Sivaprakasar' , 'Karpanai Kalangiyam' , 'Sivanuputhi chelvar'. He had contributed more than Thirty four Thamizh books for the Thamizh Literature, the most well known of which is the Nanneri, a work dealing with moral instruction. He is also well known for translating early Kannada works into the Tamil language. and for creating his own poetry.

Life
Siva prakasar, the real poet who was blessed as 'Sivanuputhichelvar' by the grace of God.
He is acclaimed as 'Karpanai Kalangiyam' by renowned scholars of Tamil – speaking world.
He compiled " Neerotta Yamaha Anthathi " to defeat an arrogant Poet. Those Venpa verses will not make both lips to touch. 
He also wrote " Yesu matha niragaranam " (The Refuting the Religion of Jesus) after defeating Christian heretics Roberto Nobili and Beschi in polemical debates. The latter work is lost to the posterity due to the perfidy of the missionaries who lost the verbal contest.

Family background 
Sivaprakasar was born in a town called Kanchipuram in Thondaimandalam in Tamil Nadu, South India into an orthodox veershaiva Tamil (Desikar) family around the middle of the 17th Century. Sivaprakasar's father was a respected spiritual leader. His father Kumara Swamy Desikar was the archaka and Dikshithar for the People of Thondaimandalam. His father left his family and gone to Thiruvannamalai with his disciples. There he planned to become a Sage. But it failed. God made him to get married. Kumara Swamy Desikar got three sons and a daughter. Siva prakasar was the first child. And his siblings were Karunai prakasar, Velaiyar and Gnambikai ammal and Wrote Many Tamil Poem's 

His sister Gnambikai married Perur Santhalinga swamigal. After sometime, Perur Santhalinga Swamigal became Tabasi and sent away Gnambikai to her brother. There were no children for them.

Karunai prakasar married Kamathci . And he wrote more than five books in Tamil. Seegalathi Sarukkam, Ishtalinga Agaval. He demised at the age of Eighteen at Thiruvengai. So, There were no children for Karunai prakasar.

Velaiyar married Meenatchi Ammal. He had a son named Sundaresanar. Velaiyar wrote more than seven books. Mayilathula, Nallur puranam, Mayilai thirattai mani maalai, Ishta linga kaithala maalai, Kumbakona Sarangathevar history as Veera singhathana puranam, Gugai Namachivaya Desikar history as Namchivaya leelai and Krisnanan history as Paarijatha leelai.
And attain mukthi motcha at Perumathur at the age of seventy two.

Sundaresanar married Karpagammal. He settled down his family in Valavanur. He had a son named Swaminatha Desikar. Swaminatha Desikar converted to Christianity, changed his name to Susai and married Gnasounthari.

Learning
To learn Tamil Grammar, Sivaprakasar along with his brothers Karunai Prakasar, Velaiyar went to Thirunelveli and found Valliyur Thambiran as their master. This teacher accepted him as his student after Sivaprakasa Swamigal had demonstrated his exceptional proficiency in this subject. The pandit taught him everything he knew, but when Sivaprakasa Swamigal tried to pay for his tuition fees, he refused, saying that he would like to have the payment in a different sort. This pandit had been having a bitter feud with another scholar. Sivaprakasa Swamigal's teacher said, 'Go to this man, defeat him in a contest of Tamil prosody, and as a condition of his defeat, make him prostrate to me'. Sivaprakasa Swamigal accepted the assignment, located the rival scholar, and challenged him to compose spontaneous verses, on a specified topic that they would both pick, that had no labial sounds in them. That is to say, the verses had to be composed without any letters such as 'm’ and 'p’, which are sounded by putting the lips together. The scholar was unable to compose even a single verse with this restriction, whereas Sivaprakasa Swamigal managed to produce thirty-one venpas on the prescribed theme. The rival scholar accepted defeat and went to prostrate before Sivaprakasa Swamigal's grammar teacher. To defeat the arrogant Poets he sang " Tiruchendur Neerotta YamahaAnthathi “

The Journey to Pommair palayam
Sivaprakasa Swamigal travelled widely all over Tamil Nadu. Santhalinga Swamigal met him along his way. They planned to visit Mailam Murugan Temple. There they met Sivagnaana Balaya Swamigal. Siva prakasa Swamigal became the First and Prime disciple of Sivagnaana Balaya Swamigal.

Great poet Sivaprakasar, who was blessed as ‘Sivanuputhichelvar’ by the grace of Aadhi Sivagnaana Balaya Swamigal has composed thirty two volumes of poetry in praise of Lord Shiva and Sri Sivagnana Balaya Swamigal.In the following five works of significance, he explains us the wisdom of his guru, which he had experienced personally.

Thurai mangalam 
Then he went to Thurai mangalam stayed along with Annamalai Reddiyar,  a donor and devotee of Saiva Siddantha. He started a mutt in so many places particularly in Thuraimangalam nearby Vaali kandapuram. He worshipped Virudhachalam Pazhamalai Nathar Temple.

Final years
He attain mukthi moksha in Nallathur near by Pondicherry, while he was 32 years old .

Contribution to Thamizh literature

Translation works
Prabhulinga Leele is a 15th-century Virasaiva work, written in Kannada and comprising 1,111 verses. It was originally composed when a Virasaiva scholar, Chamarasa, was challenged by Vaishnavas to produce a work that was greater than either the Mahabharata or the Ramayana. Shortly afterwards Chamarasa had a dream in which Lord Virabhadra, the son of Lord Siva, asked him to write a long poem on the 12th century ad Virasaiva Lingayat movement Shivasharanas like Basava, Allama Prabhu, Akkamahadevi and others. The result was Prabhulinga Leele which is a biographical anthology of vachana verses praising Lord Siva in myriad ways. Chamarasa subsequently composed Prabhulinga Leele in eleven days, after which he presented it at the court of the Vijayanagara Emperor Devaraya II in 1436,  where it was approved by both the monarch and the scholars who had challenged him. 
This Kannada work was translated into Tamil by Sivaprakasa Swamigal as "Prabhulinga Leelai".

Few Samples of his Poems
These verses are from his Nanneri poem . Particularly this poem verses were written by Sivaprakasa Swamigal as a marriage gift to his sibling's .

1. நன்னெறி

6 . தம்பதிகள் ஒற்றுமை

காதல் மனையாளும் காதலும் மாறின்றித்

தீதில் ஓருகருமம் செய்பவே – ஓதுகலை
 
எண்ணிரண்டும் ஒன்றுமதி என்முகத்தாய் நோக்கல்தான்

கண்ணிரண்டும் ஒன்றையே காண்.

பொருள் விளக்கம்:-

பதினாறு கலைகள் நிரம்பிய முழு மதி போல் முகத்தை உடையவளே, ஒரு விஷயத்தை இரண்டு கண்களும் தான் நோக்குகின்றது, ஆனால் பார்வை ஒன்று தான். அது போல் கணவனும், அன்பு மனைவியும் இரண்டு நபர்கள். ஆனாலும் சிந்தனையில், செயலில் ஒத்து இருந்தால் சிறந்த பலன்கள் பெறுவார்கள்.

In English:-

6.United couples

The loving wife and her devoted husband

should always act with the same aim in life.

For, the two eyes in a face though separate

both see only one object at the same time.

2."Naalvar Naan Mani Maalai"  – 18th verses.

நால்வர் நான்மணி மாலை

18 அப்பர் (கலித்துறை):

பாட்டால் மறைபுக ழும்பிறை சூடியைப் பாடிமகிழ்

ஊட்டா மகிழ்சொல் லிறைவனைப் பாடி உவப்புறுக்க

வேட்டால் மலிபெருங் கல்லவன்போல மிதப்பனெனப்

பூட்டா மறிதிரை வார்கடற் கேவிழப் போதுவனே

Tamil Works
Siva Prakasar's Literary works include:

 Tiruchendil Neerotta Yamaha Anthathi 
 Nanneri                                            
 Thiruvengai Kalambagam
 Thiruvengai Kovai                                       
 Thriuvengai Ula
 Thiruvengai Alangaram                                              
 Thirukoova Puranam 
 Seekalathi Puranam                                          
 Periyanayaki Ammai Nedunkazhi nedilasiriya virutham
 Periyanayaki Ammai Kalithurai          
 Naalvar Naan Mani Maalai
 Ittalinga Maalai                                       
 kaithala Maalai 
 Niranjana Maalai                                             
 Sathamani Maalai 
 Sona Saila Maalai                                            
 Pitchadana Nava Mani Maalai 
 Siva Nama Mahimai                                  
 Kurunkazhi Nedil 
 Nedunkazhi Nedil                                           
 Sidhantha Sigamani
 Vendantha Soodamani                                      
 Pazhamalai Anthathi   
 Thala Venpa                                      
 Kocha Kalippa 
 Tharukka Pari Bashai                                               
 Prabhu Linga Leelai (Translated from Kannada)                            
 Yesu Matha Niragaranam (The Refuting the Religion of Jesus)

Books about Sivagna Bala Swamigal, Pommapura Aadeenam
 Sivaprakasa Visagam
 Sivagna Bala swamigal Thaalattu                                          
 Sivagna Bala swamigal Thirupalli ezuchi 
 Sivagna Bala swamigal Pillai Thamizh                    
 Sivagna Bala swamigal Nenjuvedu Thoothu
 Sivagna Bala swamigal Kalambagam

References

External links

17th-century births
18th-century deaths
People from Kanchipuram district
Tamil poets
17th-century Indian philosophers
Year of death unknown
Indian Shaivite religious leaders
17th-century Hindu religious leaders
18th-century Hindu religious leaders
18th-century Indian philosophers
Scholars from Tamil Nadu
Kanchipuram